William Henry Wright (March 26, 1894 – June 19, 1962) was an American actor. He was frequently cast in Westerns and as a curmudgeonly and argumentative old man. Over the course of his career, Wright appeared in more than 200 film and television roles.

Career
Born in San Francisco, Wright worked as a newspaperman before beginning a career in show business. He started his acting career in vaudeville and later moved to the stage. Wright also worked in radio, appearing in more than 5,000 radio programs. His radio performances have included Zeb on Al Pearce and His Gang, George Honeywell in My Little Margie, Mahoney on Glamour Manor and the title character, Ephraim Tutt in The Amazing Mr. Tutt. He has also guest starred on radio shows, such as The Man Called X, The Charlotte Greenwood Show and The Jack Benny Program (he later appeared on the television version of the program).

Wright made his west coast film debut in 1940 Blondie Plays Cupid. In 1942, he provided the voice of Friend Owl in Walt Disney's animated film Bambi. Wright also had roles in Shadow of the Thin Man (1941) with William Powell and Myrna Loy, The Major and the Minor (1943) with Ginger Rogers and Ray Milland, So Proudly We Hail! (1943) with Claudette Colbert, Paulette Goddard and Veronica Lake, Road to Utopia (1946) with Bing Crosby and Bob Hope, Mother Wore Tights (1947) with Betty Grable, Mr. Blandings Builds His Dream House (1948) with Cary Grant and Myrna Loy, Little Women (1949) with Elizabeth Taylor, Walk Softly, Stranger (1950) with Joseph Cotten, Sunset in the West (1950) with Roy Rogers, People Will Talk (1951) with Cary Grant, The Happy Time (1952) with Charles Boyer, River of No Return (1954) with Robert Mitchum and Marilyn Monroe, The Man with the Golden Arm (1955) with Frank Sinatra and Kim Novak, Jeanne Eagels (1957) with Kim Novak, and Gunman's Walk (1958) with Van Heflin.

He portrayed Dolph Pillsbury in the Academy Award-winning picture, All the King's Men with Broderick Crawford.

During the 1950s, he guest-starred on several television series, including I Love Lucy with Lucille Ball, Desi Arnaz and William Frawley, Schlitz Playhouse of Stars, Where's Raymond?, The Bob Cummings Show, Our Miss Brooks, Mr. Adams and Eve, Father Knows Best with Robert Young and Jane Wyatt, The Millionaire, Circus Boy with Noah Beery Jr., Fury with Peter Graves, The Real McCoys with Walter Brennan, The Donna Reed Show, The Restless Gun with John Payne, Lawman with John Russell, Tales of Wells Fargo with Dale Robertson, and The Rough Riders. He even took a shift as Pete the fireman at the auxiliary fire station on Leave It To Beaver before Burt Mustin's Gus permanently replaced him.

Wright was cast in the 1958 episode "The Cave-In" episode of the syndicated series Rescue 8, starring Jim Davis and Lang Jeffries. He played an elderly man who attempts with shovel and bucket to build a backyard swimming pool for his grandchildren with disastrous results because of the lack of proper shoring.

In 1959, he was cast as J.C. Sickel in the episode, "Payment in Full" of the NBC western series, Riverboat, starring Darren McGavin. Also appearing in this episode were Aldo Ray as Hunk Farber, John Larch as Touhy, and Barbara Bel Geddes as Missy. In the story line, Farber betrays his friend and employer to collect reward money, which he uses to court his girlfriend, Missy.

From 1959 to 1961, Wright had recurring roles on NBC's Bat Masterson and CBS's Dennis the Menace. He also made multiple appearances on I Love Lucy, The Adventures of Ozzie and Harriet, The Lone Ranger, Sugarfoot, December Bride, and Maverick.

Wright made three guest appearances on Perry Mason between 1959 and 1961. He first appeared as Chuck Clark in "The Case of the Petulant Partner," then as Adam Thompson in "The Case of the Nimble Nephew," and finally as James Vardon in "The Case of the Brazen Bequest".

In 1960, Wright appeared as Mr. Johnson on CBS's The Danny Thomas Show in the episode titled, "Danny Meets Andy Griffith", the spin-off for The Andy Griffith Show. On The Andy Griffith Show, Wright portrayed department store owner and landlord Ben Weaver in three episodes from 1960 to 1962. After his death, he was replaced as Ben Weaver, first by Tol Avery, and then by Jason Johnson. Wright made his last onscreen appearances in a 1962 episode of NBC's Bonanza.

Death
On June 19, 1962, Wright died of cancer at Cedars of Lebanon Hospital in Los Angeles.

Filmography

References

External links

 
 

1894 births
1962 deaths
20th-century American male actors
American male film actors
American male radio actors
American male stage actors
American male television actors
American male voice actors
Deaths from cancer in California
Male actors from San Francisco
Male actors from Los Angeles
Vaudeville performers
Male Western (genre) film actors
Burials in California
Walter Lantz Productions people